Aku Hanya Pendatang is the second studio album from Malaysian singer Francissca Peter released in 1985.

Track listing

Awards and recognitions
 The album released by Warner Music Malaysia achieves Gold status.

Credits and personnel
Credits adapted from Aku Hanya Pendatang booklet liner notes.

 Music arrangement – Manan Ngah, Adnan Abu Hassan, Jenny Chin, Kesuma & Surya Booty
 Recorded by – Roslan, Jude Lim & Lan
 Back-up Vocals - Manan Ngah
 Additional percussions
 Arumugam
 Zahid
 Photography - Kenny Loh
 Shooting location - The Regent of Kuala Lumpur
 Artist management - Mike Bernie's Entertainment Company Sdn Bhd

References

1985 albums
Francissca Peter albums
Warner Music Group albums
Malay-language albums